Jalkr is a bright crater on Jupiter's moon Callisto measuring 74 km across (in the lower part of the image). This an example of a central dome impact crater. A smaller degraded crater in the upper part of the image is called Audr.

References

Surface features on Callisto (moon)
Impact craters on Jupiter's moons